Rock Springs is a ghost town in Bosque County, in the U.S. state of Texas.

History
Rock Springs also went by the name The Colony and was the only predominantly black community in the county. James B. Sadler was brought to the community as a slave from Tennessee shortly after the American Civil War. He founded the community when he bought  of land in 1878 and built a church and a lodge. He was a preacher at the church, which was erected in 1890 and was a one-room building, -by-, and overlooked a spring running through his property. It also had a steeple with a large bell that could be heard throughout the area. It remained this way in the 1980s, but removed its steeple and added a choir room. There is a cemetery located near the church containing the graves of its original settlers. An annual homecoming was organized in 1950 and was celebrated every first Sunday in November. Funds were provided to help renovate the church and cemetery. It was the only building in the community in the 1980s. Rock Springs became one of the first free black communities in the state.

Geography
Rock Springs was located on Farm to Market Road 1367 in south-central Bosque County near the McLennan County line.

Education
James Sadler was an educator and built a school on his land grant. Today, Rock Springs is located within the Cranfills Gap Independent School District.

References

Ghost towns in Texas